The 2013–14 season was the 114th season in Società Sportiva Lazio's history and their 26th consecutive season in the top-flight of Italian football.

Players

Squad information

Out on loan

Co-owned with other clubs

Reserves

Pre-season and friendlies

Competitions

Supercoppa Italiana

Lazio, as holders of the Coppa Italia trophy faced Juventus, the 2012–13 Serie A champions.

Serie A

League table

Results summary

Results by round

Matches

Coppa Italia

By finishing in the top 8 places in the 2012–13 Serie A, Lazio qualified directly to the Round of 16.

UEFA Europa League

Group stage

Knockout phase

Round of 32

Statistics

Appearances and goals

Goalscorers

Clean sheets

References

S.S. Lazio seasons
Lazio
Lazio